Ilyino is a rural locality (a village) in Golovinskoye Rural Settlement, Sudogodsky District, Vladimir Oblast, Russia. The population was 408 as of 2010. There are 5 streets.

Geography 
Ilyino is located 23 km west of Sudogda (the district's administrative centre) by road. Burlygino is the nearest rural locality.

References 

Rural localities in Sudogodsky District